Mkombozi Commercial Bank Plc. is a commercial bank in Tanzania. It is licensed by Bank of Tanzania, the central bank and national banking regulator. Mkombozi is a Swahili word meaning Savior

Overview
The bank is a small commercial bank that focuses on serving the lower social economic classes in Tanzania, along with their small-to-medium enterprises (SMEs). , the bank's total asset valuation was approximately TSh 178.82 billion (US$76.94 million), with shareholder's equity of approximately TSh 23.3 billion (US$10.02 million). The bank made a profit of TSh 806 million (US$346,835), in calendar year 2013.

History
The bank obtained a commercial banking licence from the Bank of Tanzania, the national banking regulator, in July 2009, and opened for business in August 2009.

Ownership
Mkombozi Commercial Bank is owned by Tanzanian Catholic dioceses, parishes, and individuals of all religious persuasions. In order to raise the TSh 7.8 billion (US$5 million) initial share capital, shares were sold to individuals and businesses, in batches of 100 shares at US$0.75 per share. In November 2014, the bank floated its shares of the Dar es Salaam Stock Exchange (DSE), with three main objectives: (a) to raise paid-up capital, above the new statutory minimum of TSh15 billion (US$9 million), before 1 March 2015 (b) to raise funds for expanded lending and (c) to source funding for opening more branches.

Branch Network
, Mkombozi Commercial Bank maintains branches at the following locations:

 Main Branch - St Joseph's Catholic Church, 40 Mansfield Street, Dar es Salaam
 Mwanza Branch - Mwanza 
 Msimbazi Branch - Msimbazi, Ilala District, Dar es Salaam
 Kariakoo Branch - Kariakoo, Dar es Salaam.
 Moshi Branch - Moshi Town, Kilimanjaro
 Bukoba Branch - Bukoba Town, Kagera
 Morogoro Branch - Morogoro Town, Morogoro
 Tegeta Branch - Tegeta, Dar es Salaam
 Dodoma Branch - Dodoma City, Dodoma
 Iringa Branch - Iringa Town, Iringa
 Njombe Branch - Njombe Town, Njombe.

Governance
The Board of Directors of the bank comprises eight individuals. The Chairman is one of the seven non-Executive Directors. The current Chairperson is Gasper C. Njuu. The current Managing Director is Respige Kimati.

See also

 List of banks in Tanzania
 List of banks in Africa
 Bank of Tanzania
 Economy of Tanzania

References

External links
 Website of Mkombozi Commercial Bank Plc
 Website of Bank of Tanzania

Banks of Tanzania
Economy of Dar es Salaam
Banks established in 2009
2009 establishments in Tanzania